The 1991 Currie Cup / Central Series was a rugby union competition held between the teams in 1991 Currie Cup and 1991 Currie Cup Central A competitions, the top two tiers of the premier domestic competition in South Africa. This formed part of the 53rd Currie Cup season since the competition started in 1889.

Teams

Competition

There were ten participating teams in the 1991 Currie Cup / Central Series, the six teams from the 1991 Currie Cup and the four teams from the 1991 Currie Cup Central A. These teams played the teams from the other league once over the course of the season, either at home or away. Teams received two points for a win and one points for a draw.

The Currie Cup team with the best record would win the Percy Frames Trophy, the Central A team with the best record would win the W.V. Simkins Trophy.

Log

Fixtures and results

Round one

Round two

Round three

Round four

Round five

Round six

Round seven

Round eight

Round nine

Round ten

See also
 1991 Currie Cup
 1991 Currie Cup Central A
 1991 Currie Cup Central B
 1991 Currie Cup Central / Rural Series
 1991 Currie Cup Rural C
 1991 Currie Cup Rural D
 1991 Lion Cup

References

1991
1991 Currie Cup